The Monte Rotondo massif is a chain of mountains on the southern side of Corsica, France.
It takes its name from Monte Rotondo, the highest peak.

Location

The Monte Rotondo massif is one of the four main blocks of mountains in Corsica.
These are (from north to south), the Monte Cinto massif, Monte Rotondo massif, Monte Renoso massif and Monte Incudine massif.
These massifs form the Corse cristalline, mainly composed of magmatic rocks such as granites, granulites,
porphyries and rhyolites.
The Monte Rotondo massif is located between the Col de Vergio and the Col de Vizzavona.
It extends westward through the hills of Ajaccio, and eastward to the Sillon de Corte.

Peaks

The main peaks are,

See also
List of mountains in Corsica by height

Notes

Sources

Mountains of Haute-Corse
Mountains of Corse-du-Sud
Massifs of Corsica